Eiksmarka is a station on the Røa Line of the Oslo Metro. It is located between Ekraveien and Lijordet, 8.9 km from Stortinget.

The station was opened in 1951 as part of the extension to Lijordet. After the closing of Grini in 1995, it is the first of three stations on the Røa Line within Bærum municipality. The station serves northwestern Bærum, including Eiksmarka and Fossum; to the north of the station is the Eiksmarka school.

The station was the site of a murder in 2002 when a 22-year-old Ethiopian woman was stabbed to death by her husband.

References

External links

Oslo Metro stations in Bærum
Railway stations opened in 1951
1951 establishments in Norway